Illinois is a state located in the Midwestern United States. According to the 2020 United States census Illinois is the 6th most populous state with  inhabitants but the 24th largest by land area spanning  of land. Illinois is divided into 102 counties and, as of 2020, contained 1,300 municipalities consisting of cities, towns, and villages.

The largest municipality by population is Chicago with 2,746,388 residents while the smallest by population is Valley City with 14 residents.

List

See also

 List of census-designated places in Illinois
 List of unincorporated communities in Illinois
 Administrative divisions of Illinois
 List of Illinois townships
 List of counties in Illinois
 List of precincts in Illinois
 List of ghost towns in Illinois
 List of city nicknames in Illinois
 Illinois census statistical areas

Notes

References

External links

 
 

 
Illinois geography-related lists
Illinois